Self-Portrait is a small painting executed in oil on oak in 1548 by the Flemish Renaissance artist Caterina van Hemessen when she was 20 years old. The painting earned her a considerable reputation and is significant not only for being an early modern female portrait but also for representing an artist in the act of painting. This was very unusual for the time; although self-portraits were common, only a few, like those of Albrecht Dürer (1471–1528), showed the artist's everyday life. Artists of the time rarely directly referred to, much less showed the tools of their profession. It is assumed Hemessen's portrait is one of the earliest ones to show a painter with a brush together with a palette and an easel. She inscribed it in Latin: "I Caterina van Hemessen have painted myself / 1548 / Her age 20".

Hemessen is shown at half length and holding a brush, looking outwards as if at her own image as she records it on the oak panel in front of her. She has only begun work on the depicted painting, no background has been put down, and only a sketch of her head can be seen. Her face is painted with soft brush-strokes, while the textures of her gown are distinguished using a wider variety of brushmarks. 

In the main image, Hemessen has shown herself elegantly clothed in a black brocade dress and red velvet sleeves. While such an outfit would have been impractical wear for an artist working with oils and brushes, her clothes are intended to indicate her social rank and attribute personal dignity. Her arms are outsized in proportion to the rest of her body.

There are a number of deliberate contradictions and explorations of mirror images at play. Hemessen holds the brush with her right hand; she would have corrected the reversal on the reflected image. Her head as shown on the panel is undersized and situated on the top left; that is opposite to the position her head appears on the actual painting. Her head is turned in the direction of the viewer but her eyes do not meet the viewer's. Typical of her work, the background is plain and dark, and gives no indication of the space occupied by the sitter. 

A number of obstacles stood in the way of contemporary women who wished to become painters. Chief amongst these was the fact that their training would involve both the dissection of cadavers and the study of the nude male form. In addition, the system of apprenticeship meant that the aspiring artist would need to live with an older artist for 4–5 years, often beginning from the age of 9–15. For these reasons, female artists were extremely rare, and those that did make it through were typically trained by a close relative, in van Hemessen's case, by her father.

Attribution
Occasional doubt has been raised as to the authenticity and provenance of the work. Some have speculated that it was created by her father Jan Sanders van Hemessen (1500–c 1566); he tended to portray women with the same large round, dark, eyes and reduced chin. However these theories are not given much weight by art historians, and the prominence of the signature is taken as evidence of Caterina's intention to mark the work as by her own hand. A c 1548 portrait by Caterina in Cologne showing a woman identified as 22 years old, seated at a virginal, has the same dimensions as this work and contains an almost identical face; likely it was either intended as a companion piece to this self-portrait, or was a depiction of her sister Christina, who was two years older.

Other variants
Besides the one in Kunstmuseum Basel, two almost identical copies exist, both attributed to Catharina herself. One in Hermitage Museum, Saint Petersburg and the other one in Michaelis Collection, Capetown.

Notes

Sources
 Jones, Susan Frances. Van Eyck to Gossaert. London: National Gallery, 2011. 
 Kemperdick, Stephan. The Early Portrait, from the Collection of the Prince of Liechtenstein and the Kunstmuseum Basel. Munich: Prestel, 2006. 
 Kleiner, Fred. Gardner's Art Through the Ages. Wadsworth, 2009. 

1548 paintings
Van Hemessen
Catharina van Hemessen
Paintings about painting